Pakatakan Mountain is a mountain located in the Catskill Mountains of New York southeast of Margaretville. Pakataghkan Mountain is the variant name. Kettle Hill is located north, Meade Hill is located east-northeast and Dry Brook Ridge is located southeast of Pakatakan Mountain.

References

Mountains of Delaware County, New York
Mountains of New York (state)